Forest phebalium is a common name for several plants and may refer to:

Leionema ambiens
Phebalium squamulosum, endemic to Eastern Australia